Miriam Lambert is an Irish puppeteer, she was the original puppeteer of Bosco. Lambert was a member of the family's Lambert Puppet Theatre in Monkstown, County Dublin.

Biography
Lambert was born in Dublin to Eugene and Mai Lambert, both famous Irish puppeteers known for creating the Lambert Puppet Theatre in 1972. She grew up in Finglas. Lambert was involved in the theatre with them appearing in the various TV shows. She began aged eight as the little witch ‘Babóg’ in Murphy agus a Chairde. Lambert went on to perform as many characters on Wanderly Wagon but particularly 'The Squirrels'. She performed as the puppeteer and voice of Bosco until 1981 when her sister Paula took over from her.

Lambert left Ireland, spending several years living in the Netherlands before returning home. She is one of the founders of The Annual International Puppet Festival Dublin and was married to Trevor Scott. After his death, Lambert moved to Thomastown, Kilkenny where she began a solo career and runs her own puppeteering company which has taken her all over the world.

Sources

People from Monkstown, County Dublin
Puppeteers
Year of birth missing (living people)
Living people
Television personalities from Dublin (city)
Irish theatre people
20th-century Irish women